Alec Reid (1931–2013) was an Irish priest.

Alec Reid may also refer to:
Alec Reid (rugby union) (1878–1952), South African rugby union player
Alec Cunningham-Reid (1895–1977), British World War I flying ace and MP
Alec Reid (footballer) (1897–1969), Scottish footballer

See also
Alec Reed (born 1934), British businessman
Alex Reid (disambiguation)
Alex Reed (disambiguation)